Charles E. Petty (January 28, 1866 – December 7, 1928) was a Major League Baseball pitcher.

External links

Major League Baseball pitchers
Cincinnati Red Stockings (AA) players
New York Giants (NL) players
Washington Senators (1891–1899) players
Cleveland Spiders players
Birmingham Maroons players
Hamilton Hams players
Minneapolis Millers (baseball) players
Birmingham Grays players
Savannah Electrics players
Norfolk Clam Eaters players
Grand Rapids Gold Bugs players
Toledo Swamp Angels players
Terre Haute Hottentots players
Columbus Babies players
Columbus River Snipes players
Cairo Egyptians players
Nashville Centennials players
Henderson Centennials players
Baseball players from Tennessee
1866 births
1928 deaths
Seattle Reds players
19th-century baseball players
Seattle Hustlers players